Eisa Ali Abbas (Arabic:عيسى علي عباس) (born 29 September 1996) is an Emirati footballer. He currently plays as a winger for Baniyas.

Career

Al-Shabab
Eisa Ali started his career at Al-Shabab and is a product of the Al-Shabab's youth system.

Emirates Club
On 28 July 2017 left Al-Shabab and signed with Emirates Club , On 14 October 2017, Eisa Ali made his professional debut for Emirates Club against Shabab Al-Ahli in the Pro League, replacing Abdelghani Mouaoui.

Baniyas
On 1 June 2019 left Emirates Club and signed with Baniyas.

External links

References

1996 births
Living people
Emirati footballers
Al Shabab Al Arabi Club Dubai players
Emirates Club players
Baniyas Club players
UAE Pro League players
Association football wingers
Place of birth missing (living people)